Herolind Nishevci is an Albanian karateka from Kosovo. Nishevci competed at the 2016 World Karate Championships at the 84 kg division and won the bronze medal.

References 

1992 births
Living people
Sportspeople from Pristina
Kosovo Albanians
Kosovan sportsmen
Kosovan male karateka
Mediterranean Games competitors for Kosovo
Competitors at the 2018 Mediterranean Games